UltraClash was a professional wrestling supercard event produced by Eastern/Extreme Championship Wrestling (ECW). The event took place in 1993 and 1998 from the ECW Arena in Philadelphia, Pennsylvania.

Dates, venues and main events

References

 
Recurring events established in 1993
Recurring events disestablished in 1998